George D. Yancopoulos (born 1959) is a Greek-American biomedical scientist who is the co-founder, president and chief scientific officer of Regeneron Pharmaceuticals.

Yancopoulos is the holder of more than 100 patents. He is a principal inventor and developer of Regeneron's ten FDA-approved or -authorized treatments, as well as of Regeneron's foundational technologies for target and drug development, such as its proprietary TRAP technology, and the VelociGene and VelocImmune antibody technologies.

Early life and education 
Son of Greek immigrants he spent his early childhood in Woodside, New York. As a student at the Bronx High School of Science, Yancopoulos was a top winner of the 1976 Westinghouse Science Talent Search. Intel and then Regeneron later assumed the title sponsorship for the Science Talent Search.

After graduating as valedictorian of both the Bronx High School of Science and Columbia College, Yancopoulos received his MD and PhD degrees in 1987 from Columbia University's College of Physicians & Surgeons. He then worked in the field of molecular immunology at Columbia University with Dr. Fred Alt, for which he received the Lucille P. Markey Scholar Award.

He currently resides in Yorktown Heights.

Scientific career
Based on his scientific publications, he was elected to both the National Academy of Sciences and the American Academy of Arts and Sciences in 2004. According to a study by the Institute for Scientific Information, he was the eleventh most highly cited scientist in the world during the 1990s, and the only scientist from the biotechnology industry on the list.

Yancopoulos has cloned novel families of growth factors, including ephrins/Ephs and angiopoietins, and elucidated the basis of how many receptors work. His work has included study of how nerves regenerate and how muscles connect to nerves.

In 1985, along with his mentor Dr. Fred Alt, he was the first to propose making mouse models with genetically human immune systems ("Human mice"). This research led to Yancopoulos developing "the most valuable mouse ever made,"  bred to have immune systems that respond just as a human's would, so that it can be used for testing how the human body might react to various pharmaceuticals and other substances.

Much of Yancopoulos and Alt's work in immunology including common recombination, accessibility control of recombination and scanning or tracking of recombinant action, has been recently validated.

Career
Yancopoulos left academia in 1989 to become the founding scientist and chief scientific officer of Regeneron Pharmaceuticals with founder and chief executive officer Leonard Schleifer, M.D., Ph.D. In 2016, Yancopoulos was also named president of the company.

Yancopoulos plays an active role in Regeneron's STEM (Science, Technology, Engineering and Math) Education commitments, including the Regeneron Science Talent Search, the nation's oldest high school science and math competition.

In 2014, Yancopoulos led the launch of the Regeneron Genetics Center, a major initiative in human genetic research that has sequenced exomes from over 1,000,000 people .

Forbes magazine states Yancopoulos' financial stake in Regeneron has made him a billionaire. He is the first research and development chief in the pharmaceutical industry to become a billionaire.

Awards
Yancopoulos won a NY/NJ CEO Lifetime Achievement Award in 2012.

Yancopoulos has been awarded Columbia University's Stevens Triennial Prize for Research and its University Medal of Excellence for Distinguished Achievement.

In 2016, Leonard Schleifer and George Yancopoulos were named the Ernst & Young Entrepreneurs of the Year 2016 National Award Winners in life sciences.

The George D. Yancopoulos Young Scientist Award is given at the Westchester Science & Engineering Fair.

He was inducted into the Bronx Science Hall of Fame in 2017 and was recognized by the Yale School of Management, CEO Institute as a Legends in Leadership Award in 2017.

In 2019, he received the Alexander Hamilton Award, Columbia’s highest honor for contributions to science and medicine and was recognized by Forbes as one of America’s 100 Most Innovative Leaders.

Yancopoulos was recognized by Fortune in 2020 as one of the World’s 25 Greatest Leaders: Heroes of the Pandemic.

In 2021, Yancopoulos won the Roy Vagelos Humanitarian Award for REGEN-COV, Prix Galien Foundation and the New York Intellectual Property Law Association’s Inventors of the Year for REGEN-COV.

Boards 
Yancopoulos serves on a number of Boards, including on Regeneron’s Board of Directors. He currently serves on the Columbia University Medical Center Board of Visitors, as Vice Chair staring in 2012; the Board of Trustees for Cold Spring Harbor Laboratory, since 2015; the Scientific Advisory Council, Alliance on Cancer Gene Therapy, since 2007; the Scleroderma Research Foundation, Scientific Advisory Board, starting in 2004; and the Pershing Square Cancer Research Alliance, Advisory Board, since 2018.

Controversies
Ethical concerns over Yancopoulos' 2020 personal and business related behavior pertaining to race and privilege have been reported. Yancopoulos has been criticized for commentary during a high school graduation speech he gave in 2020 in which he characterized the police as "scapegoats", challenged students to question "popular narratives", and use statistics and data to formulate their perspectives, within the context of social justice movements like the Black Lives Matter movement. Also in 2020, Regeneron's provision of apparently privileged access to its experimental COVID-19 therapeutic by Donald Trump and members of the Trump administration drew criticism over ethical concerns. Yancopoulos received unusual and preferential treatment from New York state related to his personal COVID-19 testing.

Key Papers

References 

People from Woodside, Queens
1959 births
Living people
The Bronx High School of Science alumni
Members of the United States National Academy of Sciences
People from Yorktown Heights, New York
Fellows of the American Academy of Arts and Sciences
American people of Greek descent
Columbia College (New York) alumni
Columbia University Vagelos College of Physicians and Surgeons alumni
21st-century American biologists
Scientists from New York (state)
20th-century Greek Americans